The Scandaroon is a breed of fancy pigeon developed over many years of selective breeding. Scandaroons, along with other varieties of domesticated pigeons, are all descendants from the rock pigeon (Columba livia).
The breed is also known as a Nuremberg Bagdad.

See also
List of pigeon breeds

References

Pigeon breeds

External links
 Scandaroon Pigeon Breed Guide - Pigeonpedia.com